DC Super Hero Girls or DC Superhero Girls (in various countries) is an American superhero web series and franchise produced by Warner Bros. Animation for Cartoon Network based on characters from DC Entertainment that launched in the third quarter of 2015.

In 2017, DC revealed that the DC Super Hero Girls line would be reimagined by Lauren Faust, who had previously worked on The Powerpuff Girls, Foster's Home for Imaginary Friends, and My Little Pony: Friendship Is Magic. This resulted in a full rebrand for the franchise in January 2019, centered around an eponymous television reboot of the same name, which began airing on Cartoon Network in March 2019. The rebooted series was heavily inspired by Faust's DC Nation Shorts entry Super Best Friends Forever from 2012, while carrying over certain themes from the earlier DC Super Hero Girls web show.

Overview

Premise 
At Super Hero High School, well-known DC heroes, both male and female, attend challenging classes and deal with all the awkwardness of growing up with the added stress of having unique superpowers.

Announcement
The multipronged franchise was announced in April 2015. The announced range included an animated web series, a graphic novel line, books from Random House, Lego tie-ins and action figures from Mattel. The intended audience is girls aged 6–12.

Website
The website was launched in early July 2015. Characters featured at launch were: Wonder Woman, Batgirl, Supergirl, Harley Quinn, Poison Ivy, Katana, and Bumblebee. Other characters including Hal Jordan, Barry Allen, Star Sapphire, Beast Boy, Cheetah, Hawkgirl and Catwoman also appear. Amanda Waller is featured as the principal of the series' setting Super Hero High. Many other DC Comics Heroes and Villains appear in the background as cameos.

Publication history 
DC Super Hero Girls was originally launched in 2015 with an animated web short on YouTube. Over the course of 2016, the franchise was expanded with a graphic novel line, additional animated and digital content, toys, and apparel. Diane Nelson, president of both DC Entertainment and Warner Bros. Interactive Entertainment, stated in 2016: "We think DC Super Hero Girls can be bigger than a $1 billion brand".

A relaunch of the franchise was announced in 2017; the relaunch began with the 2019 DC Super Hero Girls TV series. Also in 2019, the DC Zoom imprint "launched with the continuation of [the] DC Super Hero Girls" graphic novel line. The DC Ink and DC Zoom imprints were built off both the creative success of the post-New 52 DCYou program, which "employed younger creators than the New 52 titles, with the titles having a more contemporary feel", and "the financial success of the DC Super Hero Girls property". Dan DiDio, DC's co-publisher from 2010-2020, explained that "a lot of that had also to do with our interest in getting the young adult marketplace. That was DC testing the waters and wondering what a young adult book would be from DC Comics".

Cast and characters

DC Super Hero Girls has various characters inspired by the DC Universe. Certain characters are voiced by actors who have performed as the same characters previously. The characters listed below are listed on the franchise's website:

Voice cast

Media

Web series

The DC Super Hero Girls has a series of animated shorts on YouTube and their site centered on the young heroes and villains attending Super Hero High. The first season premiered on 1 October 2015. The second season premiered on 21 April 2016. The third season premiered on 26 January 2017, while the fourth season premiered on 18 January 2018. The fifth and final season premiered on 2 August 2018 and ended on 27 December 2018 as a cliffhanger.

Television series

In 2019, the DC Super Hero Girls franchise was rebooted as a TV series developed by Lauren Faust, with a continuity separate from that of the previous version of the franchise. Shorts connected with the series began to be released online on 10 January 2019 (the first short had previously received a sneak peek screening with showings of Teen Titans Go! To the Movies), and the full series premiered on Cartoon Network on 8 March 2019.

Films and specials

Special (2016)

Direct-to-video films (2016–2018)

Novels
Random House is publishing a series of text-only novels.

Original series 
Lisa Yee wrote every novel for the original series which each focus primarily on one character's experiences as a student at Super Hero High. American "big box" retailer Target has released special editions of the Wonder Woman and Batgirl novels that include additional materials (character profiles and posters).

Rebooted series 
The novels for the rebooted series are written by Erica David.

Graphic novels
The DC Graphic Novels for Kids imprint is publishing a series of graphic novels.

Original series

Rebooted series

Toys 

From 2016 to 2018, Lego featured a product line using DC Super Hero Girls logo. 12 Lego sets were distributed. These sets used Lego Friends style mini-dolls figures rather than traditional Lego minifigure, a design aimed at feminine market.

Video games

References

External links
 
 DC launches female centric universe – The Verge
 DC Unveils New Interactive Look at Its Promising "Super Hero Girls" Line – The Mary Sue
 

 
2015 web series debuts
2010s American animated television series
2010s American high school television series
American animated web series
American children's animated action television series
American children's animated adventure television series
American children's animated comedy television series
American children's animated drama television series
American children's animated superhero television series
Superhero web series
DC Comics action figure lines
Fashion dolls
DC Comics animation
DC Comics franchises
Television series by Warner Bros. Animation
Mass media franchises introduced in 2015
Mattel
Lego themes
Child versions of cartoon characters
DC Comics superheroes
DC Comics characters
DC Comics supervillains
Superhero schools